Next (stylized as neXt) is a 2020 American science fiction crime drama television series created by Manny Coto for the Fox Broadcasting Company. Set to debut as a mid-season entry during the 2019–20 United States television season, it was delayed to the fall schedule of the 2020–21 television season due to the COVID-19 pandemic and premiered on October 6, 2020. The series was cancelled in October 2020, after two episodes had aired, but the remaining episodes were aired during the series's normal time slot.

Premise
The series centers on the efforts of a homeland cybersecurity team to counter "a rogue AI with the ability to constantly improve itself".

Cast

Main

John Slattery as Paul LeBlanc, the former CEO of tech giant Zava and a prominent voice against society's growing dependence on technology and AI. He is secretly suffering from a degenerative brain disease known as fatal familial insomnia and has only a few months left to live.
Fernanda Andrade as Shea Salazar, an FBI special agent recruited by LeBlanc to help him investigate Next
Michael Mosley as CM, a convicted former hacker working with the FBI as a condition of his sentence
Gerardo Celasco as Ty Salazar, Shea's husband and a talented mechanic
Eve Harlow as Gina, a member of Shea's support team at the FBI who dislikes CM
Aaron Moten as Ben, one of Shea's investigators
Evan Whitten as Ethan Salazar, Shea and Ty's young son
Elizabeth Cappuccino as Abby, Paul's estranged daughter
Jason Butler Harner as Ted LeBlanc, Paul's younger brother who co-founded Zava and took over as CEO when Paul was fired. Against his brother's wishes, he restarted the Next program.

Recurring

 Ali Ahn as Sarina, the lead engineer at Zava involved in the Next program
 John Cassini as Ron Mathis, Shea's supervisor at the FBI
 Dann Fink as NeXt (voice)
 Chaon Cross as Deborah, Ted's wife

Guest star
 David Zayas as Nacio, a caretaker at the cabin that Ty and Ethan retreat to and who may have ulterior motives (in "File #4", "File #5" and "File #6")

Production

Development 
On February 5, 2019, it was announced that Fox had given the production a pilot order. The pilot was written by Manny Coto, and codirected by John Requa and Glenn Ficarra, with all three serving as executive producers. Production companies involved with the pilot include Zaftig Films, Fox Entertainment, and the Disney-owned 20th Century Fox Television. On May 9, 2019, it was announced that Fox had ordered the pilot to series. A few days later, it was announced the series would premiere as a mid-season replacement in the second quarter of 2020. However, it was subsequently moved to the fall schedule for the 2020–21 U.S. television season because of the COVID-19 pandemic and premiered on October 6, 2020. On October 30, 2020, Fox cancelled the series after two episodes had aired. The remaining episodes continued to air during the series's normal time slot, with the final two episodes airing on December 22, 2020.

Casting 
In February 2019, it was announced that Eve Harlow had been cast in the pilot. It was then announced in March 2019 that Fernanda Andrade and Aaron Moten had joined the cast. Alongside the pilot's order announcement in March 2019, it was reported that Michael Mosley, John Slattery, Jason Butler Harner and Elizabeth Cappuccino had joined the cast.

Episodes

Release

Marketing
On May 13, 2019, Fox released the first official trailer for the series.

Broadcast
The series premiered on October 6, 2020 on Fox. Next aired in Canada on Global, simulcast with Fox in the United States. In selected international territories, the series premiered on Disney+ under the dedicated streaming hub Star as an original series, on March 12, 2021.

Reception

Critical response
On Rotten Tomatoes, the series holds an approval rating of 64% based on 14 reviews, with an average rating of 6.33/10. The website's critical consensus reads, "John Slattery is convincing as a charismatic genius, but neXt procedural formula could have used more of the intelligence possessed by the series' rogue AI." On Metacritic, it has a weighted average score of 58 out of 100 based on 15 reviews, indicating "mixed or average reviews".

Ratings

Notes

References

External links
 
 

2020 American television series debuts
2020 American television series endings
2020s American crime drama television series
2020s American science fiction television series
Fox Broadcasting Company original programming
Television series by 20th Century Fox Television
Television series by Fox Entertainment
Television series about artificial intelligence
Television productions postponed due to the COVID-19 pandemic
Television shows set in Oregon